Richard Bryan (born 1937) is an American attorney and politician.

Richard Bryan may also refer to:

Richard Bryan (MP), Member of Parliament (MP) for Lostwithiel
Richard Bryan (rugby union) (born 1977), English rugby union player
Richard Bryan (footballer) (born 1995), English footballer

See also
Rick Bryan (1962–2009), American football player